John Herbert Roberts, 1st Baron Clwyd (8 August 1863 – 19 December 1955), known as Sir Herbert Roberts, 1st Baronet, from 1903 to 1919, was a Welsh Liberal politician.

Roberts was the son of John Roberts, of Abergele, Denbighshire. He was elected to the House of Commons for Denbighshire West in 1892, a seat he held until 1918. Between 1912 and 1918 he was Chairman of the Welsh Liberal Parliamentary Party. Roberts was created a Baronet, of Brynwenalt of Kilmaron, in 1903 and in 1919 he was raised to the peerage as Baron Clwyd, of Abergele in the County of Denbigh.

Lord Clwyd married Hannah, daughter of William Sproston Caine and Alice Brown Caine, and granddaughter of Hugh Stowell Brown, in 1893. She died in 1951. Clwyd died in December 1955, aged 92, and was succeeded in his titles by his son Trevor Roberts.

References

External links

Kidd, Charles, Williamson, David (editors). Debrett's Peerage and Baronetage (1990 edition). New York: St Martin's Press, 1990, 

 

1863 births
1955 deaths
1
Liberal Party (UK) MPs for Welsh constituencies
UK MPs 1892–1895
UK MPs 1895–1900
UK MPs 1900–1906
UK MPs 1906–1910
UK MPs 1910
UK MPs 1910–1918
UK MPs who were granted peerages
Barons created by George V